is a town located in Suntō District, Shizuoka Prefecture, Japan. ,  the town had an estimated population of 43,568 in 18154 households  and a population density of 1,600 persons per km².

Geography
Nagaizumi is located in east-central Shizuoka Prefecture, south of Mount Fuji, and north of Izu Peninsula. The area has a temperate maritime climate with hot, humid summers and mild, cool winters.

Neighboring municipalities
Shizuoka Prefecture
Mishima
Numazu
Susono
Fuji
Shimizu

Demographics
Per Japanese census data, the population of Nagaizumi has been increasing rapidly over the past 60 years.

Climate
The city has a climate characterized by hot and humid summers, and relatively mild winters (Köppen climate classification Cfa).  The average annual temperature in Nagaizumi is 14.1 °C. The average annual rainfall is 1945 mm with September as the wettest month. The temperatures are highest on average in August, at around 25.2 °C, and lowest in January, at around 3.7 °C.

History
Nagaizumi is located in the far eastern portion of former Suruga Province, and was largely tenryō territory under direct control of the Tokugawa shogunate in the Edo period. With the establishment of the modern municipalities system in the early Meiji period on April 1, 1888, the area was reorganized into the village of Nagaizumi through the merger of 10 small hamlets. Nagaizumi achieved town status on April 1, 1960.

Economy
Nagaizumi is host to numerous industries, including paper mills, and chemical plants. Large factories are operated by Toray Industries, Kyowa Hakko Kirin Co., Ltd., Toho Tenax, Tokushu Paper Mfg. Co., Ltd., and Olympus Corporation. Nagaizumi also serves as a bedroom community for the industrial zones in neighboring Mishima and Numazu. Agricultural products of Nagaizumi include persimmons,  mountain yam, white welsh onions and muskmelon.

Education
Nagaizumi has three public elementary schools and two public middle schools operated by the town government . The town does not have a public high school, but has one private high school.

Transportation
Although the Tōmei Expressway and the Tōkaidō Shinkansen both pass through Nagaizumi, the town is not served by either an interchange or Shinkansen passenger railway station. The city is served by non-toll roads and standard passenger train service.

Railroad
 Central Japan Railway Company -  Gotemba Line
 -

Highway
  Tomei Expressway
 Shin-Tōmei Expressway - Nagaizumi-Numazu IC
 Izu-Jūkan Expressway

Sister city relations
  - Whanganui, New Zealand from September 1988.
  - Aoki, Nagano, Japan from November 2007.

Local attractions
 Fuji Bamboo Garden

Notable people from Nagaizumi
Shingo Ono, professional baseball player
Taketo Shiokawa, professional soccer player

References

External links

Nagaizumi official website (Japanese)

Towns in Shizuoka Prefecture
Nagaizumi, Shizuoka